St George's Church, Kidderminster is a Church of England parish church in Kidderminster, Worcestershire, England. The church is a Grade II* listed building.

History
St George’s Church was a Commissioners' church designed by architect Francis Goodwin. Its grant of just over £17,000,  was the third-largest given by the commission to any church outside London. It opened in 1824.

A fire which originated in the belfry destroyed the interior of the church on 20 November 1922 and it was restored by Giles Gilbert Scott.

Incumbents

William Villiers 1824 - 1842
John Downall 1842 - 1847 
Thomas Baker Morrell 1847 - 1852
Charles John McQueen Mottram 1852 - 1872 
Frederic Rawlins Evans 1872 - 1876
Stephen Brown Bathe 1876 - 1887
Theobald W. Church 1887 - 1915
Albert Edward Riland Bedford 1915 - 1918
Robert Hume Stephen 1918 - 1932
Benjamin John Isaacs 1932 - 1940
P.J. Martin 1940 - 1959
Canon L.W. Chidzey 1959 - 1968
H. Edward Montague-Youens from 1969 - 1972
Peter D. Chippendale 1972 - 1976 
Andrew John Piggott until 1994
Canon Nick Barker until 2007
David Hildred from 2020

Organ
The church obtained a pipe organ in 1828 by Elliot and Hill. In 1869 this was rebuilt by Hill but was destroyed in the fire of 1922. In 1929 a new organ was installed by G.H.C. Foskett. The organ currently comprises 3 manuals and pedals with 45 speaking stops. A specification of the organ can be found on the National Pipe Organ Register.

Organists

C.S. Herve 1836 - 1837
Charles Baldwin from 1837
W. White ca. 1841
James Fitzgerald 1850 - 1895 (formerly assistant organist at Bristol Cathedral, from 1850 to 1868 also choirmaster at St Mary’s)
Frank Thornton 1896 - 1900 (formerly organist at St Cuthbert’s Church, Birmingham)
C. Milton Bill from1900 (formerly organist at Newport Parish Church, Isle of Wight)
Richard Alfred Taylor 
Harold Evers ca. 1941 until 1976
Tim Morris from 1976

References

Church of England church buildings in Worcestershire
Grade II* listed churches in Worcestershire
Churches completed in 1824
1824 establishments in England
Buildings and structures in Kidderminster